Neo Dada is a music album by the Norwegian composer and artist Jono El Grande, released by Rune Grammofon on 16 March 2009.

Reception

Several reviews commented on the experimental nature of the album. Lukas Suveg, in a positive review for Tiny Mix Tapes, writes "Jono El Grande strikes a near-perfect balance between the traditional and the avant-garde, and his playful approach lends the album a great amount of accessibility without compromising his adventurous spirit." AllMusic's François Couture described Neo Dada as "late-era Zappa minus the scatological routines, plus an intentionally cheesy Latin element (think Señor Coconut)."

John L Walters, writing for The Guardian, considered the work an improvement over Jono El Grande's previous album Fevergreens, saying "Neo Dada sounds much more confident, exuberant, artful and bloody-minded." Dan Raper of PopMatters concludes "Cycling quickly through klezmer, jazz, and prog-rock, Jono El Grande presents an intriguing if a little ADD interpretation of experimental music."

Track listing

References

2009 albums
Jono El Grande albums